Bernie Guthrie (22 September 1911 – 26 April 1982) was an Australian rules footballer who played for the Collingwood Football Club and North Melbourne Football Club in the Victorian Football League (VFL).

Notes

External links 
		
Bernie Guthrie's profile at Collingwood Forever

1911 births
1982 deaths
Australian rules footballers from Victoria (Australia)
Collingwood Football Club players
North Melbourne Football Club players